Chong Boon (Chinese: 崇文 Chóng Wén) is a precinct located at Ang Mo Kio, Singapore. It has precincts of Neighbourhood 4.

Politics
Chong Boon is part of Teck Ghee (Chinese: 德义 Dé Yì) and Cheng San-Seletar divisions, in Ang Mo Kio Group Representation Constituency. The MPs are Nadia Ahmad Samdin and Prime Minister Lee Hsien Loong.

References

 
North Region, Singapore
Hokkien place names